List of Choctaw chiefs is a record of the political leaders who served the Choctaws in Alabama, Louisiana, Mississippi, and Oklahoma.

Original three divisions

The eastern Choctaw Nation, in what is now Mississippi and Alabama, was divided into three regions: Okla Hannali, Okla Falaya, and Okla Tannip.

Okla Hannali (Six Towns)
 Pushmataha
 Oklahoma or Tapenahomma (Nephew of Pushmataha)
 General Hummingbird
 Nitakechi
 Sam Garland

Okla Falaya
 Apukshunnubbee
 Robert Cole
 Greenwood Leflore

Okla Tannip
 Homastubbee
 Mushulatubbee
 David Folsom

District Chiefs in the New Indian Territory
After removal, the Choctaws set up their government also divided up in three regions: Apukshunnubbee, Mushulatubbee, and Pushmataha. The regions were named after the three influential Choctaw leaders of the "old country."

Moshulatubbee District
 Mushulatubbee, 1834–1836
 Joseph Kincaid, 1836–1838
 John McKinney, 1838–1842
 Nathaniel Folsom, 1842–1846
 Peter Folsom, 1846–1850
 Cornelius McCurtain, 1850–1854
 David McCoy, 1854–1857

Apukshunnubbee District
 Thomas LeFlore, 1834-1838
 James Fletcher, 1838-1842
 Thomas LeFlore, 1842-1850
 George W. Harkins, 1850–1857

Pushmataha District
 Nitakechi, 1834-1838
 Pierre Juzan, 1838-1841
 Isaac Folsom, 1841-1846
 Nitakechi, Died
 Salas Fisher, 1846-1854
 George Folsom, 1850-1854
 Nicholas Cochnauer, 1854-1857

Unified leadership as governor
 Alfred Wade, 1857-1858
 Tandy Walker, 1858-1859
 Basil LeFlore, 1859-1860

Principal Chiefs
 George Hudson, 1860-1862
 Samuel Garland, 1862-1864
 Peter Pitchlynn, 1864-1866
 Allen Wright, 1866-1870
 William Bryant, 1870-1874
 Coleman Cole, 1874-1878
 Isaac Garvin, 1878-1880
 Jack McCurtain, 1880-1884
 Edmund McCurtain, 1884-1886
 Thompson McKinney, 1886-1888
 Benjamin Franklin Smallwood, 1888-1890
 Wilson Jones, 1890-1894
 Jefferson Gardner, 1894-1896
 Green McCurtain, 1896-1900
 Gilbert Dukes, 1900-1902
 Green McCurtain, 1902-1906

The Choctaw Nation was temporarily discontinued in 1906 with the advent of Oklahoma statehood.

Choctaw Nation "token" government
Chiefs were appointed by the U.S. President after U. S. Congress stripped recognition of the Choctaw national government.

 Green McCurtain, 1906-1910, appointed by President Theodore Roosevelt
 Victor Locke, Jr., 1910-1918, appointed by President Howard Taft
 William F. Semple, 1918-1922, appointed by President Woodrow Wilson 
 William H. Harrison, 1922-1929, appointed by President Warren G. Harding
 Ben Dwight, 1930-1936, appointed by President Herbert Hoover
 William Durant, 1937-1948, appointed by President Franklin Delano Roosevelt
 Harry J. W. Belvin, 1948-1970, appointed by President Harry S. Truman (Choctaw were allowed to elect their delegate in 1948 and 1954 which the president confirmed.)

Current tribes
Indian termination policy was a policy that the United States Congress legislated in 1953 to assimilate the Native American communities with mainstream America. In 1959, the Choctaw Termination Act was passed. Unless repealed by the federal government, the Choctaw Nation of Oklahoma would effectively be terminated as a sovereign nation as of August 25, 1970.

After a long struggle for recognition, the Mississippi Choctaw received recognition in 1918. The Mississippi Choctaw soon received lands, educational benefits, and a long overdue health care system.

In 1945, lands in Neshoba County, Mississippi and the surrounding counties were set aside as a federal Indian reservation. There are eight communities of reservation land: Bogue Chitto, Bogue Homa, Conehatta, Crystal Ridge, Pearl River, Red Water, Tucker, and Standing Pine. The Indian Reorganization Act of 1934 allowed the Mississippi Choctaws to become re-organized on April 20, 1945 as the Mississippi Band of Choctaw Indians.

Oklahoma Choctaws

Choctaw Nation of Oklahoma
 Harry J. W. Belvin, 1948, 1954, 1971–1975
 C. David Gardner, 1975–1978
 Hollis E. Roberts, 1978–1997
 Gregory E. Pyle, 1997–2014
Gary Batton, 2014–Present

Mississippi Choctaws

Pre-reorganization Era (Before 1945)

 Wesley Johnson (Wesley Wakatubee), 1913-c. 1914 (Chief)
 Ed Willis
 Pat Chitto
 Joe Chitto

Mississippi Band of Choctaw Indians (1945-Present)
 Emmette York (Chairman)
 Phillip Martin (Chairman)
 Calvin Isaac (Chief) 
 Phillip Martin, 1978—2007 (Chief) 
 Beasley Denson, 2007—2011 (Chief/Miko) 
 Phyliss J. Anderson, 2011—2019 (Chief) 
 Cyrus Ben, 2019—present (Chief)

Louisiana Choctaws

Jena Band of Choctaw Indians
Christina M. Norris, present

Notes

External links
Choctaw chiefs

 
Choctaw Nation of Oklahoma politicians
Choctaw